Roland Barry Gregoire (born 23 November 1958) is an English former professional footballer who played as a striker.

Career
Born in Liverpool, Gregoire was educated at St Bede's Grammar School in Bradford. He began his career with Halifax Town, making five league appearances in the 1977–78 season. Gregoire moved to Sunderland for £5,000 in January 1978, becoming the first black player to play for them. Whilst playing for Halifax reserves, Gregoire scored a hat-trick against Sunderland reserves to prompt Sunderland manager Jimmy Adamson into signing him. He made his debut for Sunderland against Hull City due to injuries to other first team strikers. Gregoire spent two seasons with Sunderland — scoring one goal in nine league appearances — before retiring in 1980 due to injury.

References

1958 births
Living people
English footballers
Halifax Town A.F.C. players
Sunderland A.F.C. players
English Football League players
Association football forwards
People educated at St. Bede's Grammar School